Myrmica myrmicoxena is a species of ant that can be found in France and Spain.

References

Myrmica
Insects described in 1895